TCF3 fusion partner is a protein that in humans is encoded by the TFPT gene.

References

Further reading